This is a list of people who served as Lord Lieutenant of Middlesex. From 1794 to 1965, all Lord Lieutenants were also Custos Rotulorum of Middlesex.  The office was abolished on 1 April 1965, with the creation of Greater London and the post of Lord Lieutenant of Greater London, with small parts of Middlesex coming under the jurisdiction of the Lord Lieutenant of Surrey, the Lord Lieutenant of Hertfordshire.

William Paget, 1st Baron Paget 1551–?
...
Sir William Cecil in 1569
...
Sir Christopher Hatton 27 October 1590 – 20 November 1591
..
In commission 30 April 1617 – 1 June 1622
George Villiers, 1st Duke of Buckingham 1 June 1622 – 23 August 1628
Edward Sackville, 4th Earl of Dorset 6 October 1628 – 1642 jointly with
Henry Rich, 1st Earl of Holland 6 October 1628 – 1643
Interregnum
Richard Sackville, 5th Earl of Dorset 30 July 1660 – 16 July 1662 jointly with
Thomas Howard, 1st Earl of Berkshire 30 July 1660 – 16 July 1662
George Monck, 1st Duke of Albemarle  16 July 1662 – 3 January 1670
William Craven, 1st Earl of Craven 22 January 1670 – 28 March 1689
John Holles, 4th Earl of Clare 28 March 1689 – 13 February 1692
William Russell, 1st Duke of Bedford 13 February 1692 – 7 September 1700
Lord Edward Russell 22 November 1700 – 27 November 1701
Wriothesley Russell, 2nd Duke of Bedford 27 November 1701 – 19 September 1711
John Sheffield, 1st Duke of Buckingham and Normanby 19 September 1711 – 28 October 1714
Thomas Pelham-Holles, 1st Duke of Newcastle-upon-Tyne 28 October 1714 – 2 February 1763
Hugh Percy, 1st Duke of Northumberland 2 February 1763 – 6 June 1786
In commission
William Cavendish-Bentinck, Marquess of Titchfield 6 August 1794 – 29 December 1841
James Gascoyne-Cecil, 2nd Marquess of Salisbury 29 December 1841 – 12 April 1868
Arthur Wellesley, 2nd Duke of Wellington 28 May 1868 – 13 August 1884
George Byng, 3rd Earl of Strafford 20 September 1884 – 28 March 1898
Herbrand Russell, 11th Duke of Bedford 20 June 1898 – 26 April 1926
John Baring, 2nd Baron Revelstoke 26 April 1926 – 19 April 1929
George Kemp, 1st Baron Rochdale 11 June 1929 – 24 March 1945
Charles Latham, 1st Baron Latham 8 September 1945 – 1 May 1956
Frederick Handley Page 8 August 1956 – 6 January 1961
Sir John Crocker 6 January 1961 – 9 March 1963
Gerard Bucknall 10 July 1963 – 1965

Deputy lieutenants
A deputy lieutenant of Middlesex is commissioned by the Lord Lieutenant of Middlesex. Deputy lieutenants support the work of the lord-lieutenant. There can be several deputy lieutenants at any time, depending on the population of the county. Their appointment does not terminate with the changing of the lord-lieutenant, but they usually retire at age 75.

18th Century
18 April 1799: John Meyrick, Esq.
18 April 1799: William Baldwin, Esq.

19th Century
14 August 1807: George Woodroffe, Esq.
14 August 1807: Josias Du Pré Porcher, Esq.
14 August 1807: George Vincent, Esq.
14 August 1807: William Pope, Esq.
14 August 1807: Harry Edgell, Esq.
14 August 1807: Arthur Benson, Esq.
30 December 1807: Edward Hilliard, Esq.
30 December 1807: George Townsend, Esq.
25 January 1831: Osborne Yeats, Esq.
18 June 1831: The Duke of Portland

References

Sources
 
 

Middlesex
History of local government in Middlesex
1965 disestablishments in England